Iravati Harshe is an Indian actress and dubbing artist. Harshe has worked in many television serials. She is a trained Bharatanatyam dancer.

Filmography
 Split Wide Open (1999)
 Hey Ram (Hindi, 2000)
 Shararat (Hindi, 2002) 
 Kuchh Meetha Ho Jaye (Hindi, 2005)
 Mithya (2008)
 Raat Gayi, Baat Gayi? (Hindi, 2009)
 We Are Family (Hindi, 2010)
 Mittal Vs Mittal (Hindi, 2010)
 Michael (2011)
 Kaccha Limboo (Hindi, 2011)
 Hate Story (Hindi, 2012)
 Astu (Marathi film 2015)
 Kaasav (2017, Marathi film) 
 Simmba (Hindi, 2018)
 Aapla Manus (Marathi film, 2018)
 Take Care Good Night
 Bhai: Vyakti Ki Valli (Marathi film, 2019)
 Tadka (film) (Hindi, 2022)
 Shamshera (Hindi, 2022)

Television
 Dill Mill Gayye Achanak 37 Saal Baad (TV Series), 2002 
 Shanti Kabhie Kabhie, 1997
 Mrityudand Ankahee Waris Tanha Sanjivani Surabhi Chota Muh or Badi Baat,1999

Dubbing
 French version of Dil To Pagal Hai, voice of Madhuri Dixit.
 Hindi version of Golden Compass, voice of Nicole Kidman.

Awards
 Won Best Actress Kaasav Zee Chitra Gaurav Awards 2017
 Nominated Best Actress in a Leading Role for Ankahee'' at 1st Indian Telly Awards.

References

External links
 
 Indicine.com

Indian television actresses
Living people
Actresses in Hindi cinema
Year of birth missing (living people)